Season 1994–95 was the 111th football season in which Dumbarton competed at a Scottish national level, entering the Scottish Football League for the 89th time, the Scottish Cup for the 100th time, the Scottish League Cup for the 48th time and the Scottish Challenge Cup for the fifth time.

Overview 
Dumbarton began the league season in the newly structured Division 2 (and the first season where 3 points would be awarded for a win) as one of the favourites to take the title, however things did not begin well with only one win being taken from the first 5 games.  However, by the end of the year, results had taken them back into the challenging pack, and by the beginning of March, had broken clear to take the lead.  This Dumbarton would hold until the final 3 games.  Then a poor draw against Queen of the South saw them replaced at the top by Morton.  The next game against a strong Morton side was lost, as was the title, meaning that only a win in the final game away against Stirling Albion would secure promotion.  This was done, not without a few nervous moments, and Division 1 football for next season was the prize.

In the national cup competitions, however, for the third year in a row, success was extinguished at the first attempt.  In the Scottish Cup Stirling Albion would advance in Dumbarton's place in the first round, after a drawn match.

In the League Cup, Premier Division Hearts defeated Dumbarton easily in the second round.

And it was a fifth straight first round defeat in the B&Q Cup - this time to St Johnstone.

Locally, in the Stirlingshire Cup, the story was no better, with two qualifying defeats to Falkirk and Stirling Albion.

Finally there was success in the Stirling Sixes tournament played in September at Forthbank Stadium, Stirling.  After sectional wins over Falkirk (4-0) and Alloa Athletic (1-0) and a draw against Clydebank (1-1), Dumbarton defeated Stenhousemuir 2-0 in the final.

Results & fixtures

Scottish Second Division

Coca-Cola League Cup

B&Q Cup

Tennant's Scottish Cup

Stirlingshire Cup

Pre-season/Other Matches

League table

Player statistics

Squad 

|}

Transfers

Players in

Players out

Reserve team
Dumbarton competed in the Scottish Reserve League (West), and with 9 wins and 4 draws from 28 games, finished 12th of 15.

Trivia
 The League match against East Fife on 8 October marked Stevie Gow's 200th appearance for Dumbarton in all national competitions - the 22nd Dumbarton player to break the 'double century'.
 The Scottish Cup match against Stirling Albion on 19 December marked Martin Mooney's 100th appearance for Dumbarton in all national competitions - the 108th Dumbarton player to reach this milestone.
 The previous season had seen the SFA permit a specialist goalkeeper to be named on the substitutes bench, and it was Peter Dennison who was Dumbarton's first ever goalkeeper substitution during the B&Q Cup match on 17 September against St Johnstone. Dennison was also the club's youngest ever player at 16 years and 79 days.
 The signing of John Burridge following an injury to Dumbarton's first choice keeper, Ian MacFarlane was to set a new record for the oldest player to make an appearance for the club - 42 years and 312 days.

See also
 1994–95 in Scottish football

References

External links
Peter Dennison (Dumbarton Football Club Historical Archive) 
Stephen Dallas (Dumbarton Football Club Historical Archive) 
Steve Mooney (Dumbarton Football Club Historical Archive)
Scottish Football Historical Archive

Dumbarton F.C. seasons
Scottish football clubs 1994–95 season